Shelu is a railway station on the Central line of the Mumbai Suburban Railway network.

Gallery

References

Railway stations in Raigad district
Mumbai Suburban Railway stations
Mumbai CR railway division
Kalyan-Lonavala rail line